Doloplazy may refer to places in the Czech Republic:

Doloplazy (Olomouc District), a municipality and village in the Olomouc Region
Doloplazy (Prostějov District), a municipality and village in the Olomouc Region
Doloplazy, a hamlet and part of Neveklov in the Central Bohemian Region